Tandur is a mandal in Mancherial district of the Indian state of Telangana. It is located in Bellamaplly revenue division.

Administrative divisions
There are 20 villages in Tandur.

Geography

References

External links
Adilabad Mandals and their Gram Panchayats (map)

Villages in Mancherial district
Mandal headquarters in Mancherial district